Aunli is a Norwegian surname. Notable people with the surname include:

 Berit Aunli (born 1956), Norwegian cross country skier, wife of Ove
 Ove Aunli (born 1956), Norwegian cross country skier

Norwegian-language surnames